Whitletts Victoria Football Club are a Scottish football club, historically based in the Whitletts area of Ayr, South Ayrshire.

Nicknamed The Vics, the club were formed in 1944  and currently play at Dam Park Stadium, near Ayr town centre. The club were forced to leave their traditional home of Voluntary Park in Whitletts, which doubled up as a greyhound racing track, in February 2011, after actions by the leaseholder raised major health and safety concerns, forcing the local council to close the stadium. The stadium has since been demolished and is now the site of a new social housing complex called Victoria Crescent, after the club.

History
On the park, the greatest era in the club's history was the mid- to late 1950s. In 1956 the club played in front of 20,100 people at Shawfield Stadium in the semi final of the Scottish Junior Cup, only to lose 3–2 to eventual winners Petershill. However, in 1957-58 the Club won the Western League (South) Championship, losing out to North Champions Irvine Meadow in the play-off to determine the destination of the league championship itself.

Since then the club has had, in the main, a troubled time, with its very existence called into question on a number of occasions. However, in recent years, developments on and off the park have placed the club on a more secure foundation. In 2017–18 the Club won promotion to the newly formed West Region Championship and in 2018 formed its own charity, Vics in the Community, providing free coaching to local youngsters and starting the development of a youth player pathway.

In 2020, the club took the decision after 75 years of membership of the SJFA, to join the pyramid system in Scottish football as one of the inaugural members of the West of Scotland Football League.

On 10 October 2020, the club announced they would not be participating in the inaugural season of the West of Scotland League due to concerns relating to the COVID-19 pandemic.

Non-playing staff

Committee

Management

Honours
Western League (South) champions 1957–58
Ayrshire Second Division winners: 1979–80, 1981–82, 1985–86
Kyle & Carrick Cup: 1988–89, 1989–90

References

External links
 The Official Whitletts Victoria FC website

Football clubs in Scotland
Scottish Junior Football Association clubs
Sport in Ayr
Association football clubs established in 1944
1944 establishments in Scotland
West of Scotland Football League teams
Football in South Ayrshire